Gevorg Ghazaryan was an Armenian politician who served as Minister of Enlightenment (Public Education and Art) of the First Republic of Armenia in 1920.

References 

Armenian politicians
People of the First Republic of Armenia